
Year 743 (DCCXLIII) was a common year starting on Tuesday (link will display the full calendar) of the Julian calendar. The denomination 743 for this year has been used since the early medieval period, when the Anno Domini calendar era became the prevalent method in Europe for naming years.

Events 
 By place 
 Byzantine Empire 
 Summer – Emperor Constantine V defeats his brother-in-law Artabasdos, who has led a two-year insurrection in an attempt to usurp the Byzantine throne. He heads for Constantinople, and captures the capital three months later. Artabasdos and his son Niketas are publicly blinded, and relegated to the monastery of Chora. Constantine renews his policy of Iconoclasm.
 Constantine V reforms the old Imperial Guard of Constantinople into new elite cavalry and infantry units, called tagmata (Greek for 'the regiments'). He uses these troops against a rebellious theme in north-west Anatolia (modern Turkey), and later for offensive campaigns against Arab Muslim raiders and Bulgars.

 Europe 
 Childeric III re-succeeds to the throne of the Frankish Kingdom as the last Merovingian king, (until his death in 754) after an interregnum of seven years. Power remains firmly in the hands of the major domus, currently Carloman and Pepin the Short.
 Duke Odilo of Bavaria comes to the aid of Boruth, prince (knyaz) of the Carantanians, against repeated Avar incursions in present-day Austria, and is able to vassalize the Slavic principality. In exchange for Bavarian assistance, Boruth accepts his overlordship and is converted to Christianity.

 Britain 
 King Æthelbald of Mercia joins forces with Wessex and attacks Gwent and Powys in Mid Wales (approximate date).

 Arabian Empire 
 February 6 – Caliph Hisham ibn Abd al-Malik dies after a 19-year reign, in which the Arab expansion in Europe has been stopped and the Umayyad Caliphate has come under pressure from the Turks in Central Asia and Berbers in North Africa. He is succeeded by his nephew Al-Walid II, who has Khalid al-Qasri, former governor of Iraq, imprisoned and tortured.

 Japan 
 Emperor Shōmu changes the law of Perpetual Ownership of Cultivated Lands. This permits aristocrats and members of the clergy to cultivate land. The new farmland will be called shoin.

 Americas 
 In one of the final battles of the Third Tikal-Calakmul War, the city of El Peru is taken by Tikal.

 Asia 
743 Caspian Gates earthquake. It took place in the Caspian Gates (Gates of Alexander). The location is identified with either Derbent, Russia or Talis, Iran. 

 By topic 
 Religion 
 The Concilium Germanicum: First major Church synod held in the eastern parts of the Frankish Kingdom. Organized by Carloman, Mayor of the Palace of Austrasia, and presided over by Saint Boniface, who is solidified in his position as leader of the Frankish church.

Births 
 ′Abd Allah ibn Wahb, Muslim jurist (d. 813)

Deaths 
 February 6 – Hisham ibn Abd al-Malik, Muslim caliph (b. 691)
 Eucherius, Frankish bishop
 Godescalc, duke of Benevento
 Khalid al-Qasri, Syrian Arab governor
 Pei Yaoqing, chancellor of the Tang dynasty (b. 681)
 Rigobert, Frankish abbot and bishop 
 Theudimer (also known as Tudmir), Visigothic count
 Wihtburh, Anglo-Saxon abbess

References

Sources